Joaquin Bello (born 20 July 2000) is a British beach volleyball player.

Together with his twin brother Javier, they are the current British No. 1 team. They won the bronze medal at the 2022 Commonwealth Games in Birmingham. He is a 4-time medallist on the FIVB World Tour, winning Britain’s only gold medal, and a 3-time British champion.

Junior career 

Joaquin and Javier started playing volleyball at the age of 6 at their local club in Madrid. In 2011, their family moved to London and they joined Richmond Volleyball Club, where they won multiple national championships in indoor and beach volleyball in all the underage categories.

In 2016, the brothers started their international beach volleyball career and earned their first England cap at the U17 NEVZA Beach Volleyball Championships, eventually taking the gold medal.

Beach volleyball made its Commonwealth Games debut in the 2017 Commonwealth Youth Games in Nassau, Bahamas. There, the duo won gold, helping England to top the medal table.

Whilst in the middle of their A-levels, the Bello brothers qualified for the 2018 Youth Olympic Games in Buenos Aires, making them the first ever British team to qualify for this competition. They clinched the 5th and last European spot for the Games by beating Hungary in the last playoff match. Representing Team GB for their first time, the brothers lost in the quarterfinal against host country Argentina, ending up in 5th place.

They finished in 5th place at the U19 World Championships in Nanjing, China - Britain’s highest ever finish at any world junior event.

Senior career 
Joaquin played his first World Tour event in Aydin, Turkey in 2017.

In 2019, the twins won a bronze medal in Rubavu, Rwanda after being defeated by the eventual champions Japan in the semifinal. It was the first ever World Tour medal for a British men’s team.

In 2021, they won their first World Tour gold medal in Cortegaça, Portugal, the first in British history. They followed that with another medal, a bronze at the World Tour event in Nijmegen.

In 2022, the Volleyball World Beach Pro Tour replaced the FIVB World Tour and the Bello brothers won another bronze medal in Cortegaça, Portugal.

With his brother, he achieved a career-high world ranking of No. 43 in May 2022.

At the 2022 Commonwealth Games, the brothers competed for Team England at the Smithfield arena, later nicknamed the "Bellodrome”. They achieved a historic bronze medal, the first for England at the Commonwealth Games, just 5 years on from their triumph at the Commonwealth Youth Games.

Joaquin has won 3 consecutive British Championship titles, winning the UK Beach Tour Finals in 2020, 2021 and 2022.

Personal life 
After moving to London in 2011, Joaquin attended Gunnersbury Catholic School in Brentford, London.

The brothers train in Barnes and are coached by their father Luis Bello, a former professional player and coach. Beach volleyball is a full family affair with their younger brother also playing volleyball and their mum coordinating their support team.

Joaquin is currently studying Medicine at Imperial College School of Medicine.

References

External links 

 Joaquin Bello at the Olympedia database
 Joaquin Bello at Commonwealth Games England
 Joaquin Bello at the British Volleyball Federation
 Joaquin Bello at Volleyball England
 Joaquin Bello at the UK Beach Tour

2000 births
Living people
Bello
British men's beach volleyball players
English men's beach volleyball players
Beach volleyball blockers
FIVB World Tour award winners
Beach volleyball players at the 2018 Summer Youth Olympics
Beach volleyball players at the 2022 Commonwealth Games
Medallists at the 2022 Commonwealth Games
Commonwealth Games bronze medallists for England